Khan is a surname of Turko-Mongol origin, commonly found in parts of India, Pakistan, Afghanistan, Bangladesh and Iran. It is derived from the historic title khan, referring to a military chief or ruler; it originated as a hereditary title among nomadic tribes in the Central and Eastern Eurasian Steppe during antiquity and was popularized by Turkic dynasties in the rest of Asia as well as in Eastern Europe during the medieval period. 

The name's earliest discovered usage as a title for chiefs and for monarchs dates back respectively to the Xianbei and the Rourans, two proto-Mongolic societies in Inner Asia during antiquity; in the Pannonian Basin and Carpathian Mountains and their surrounding regions of Central and Southeast Europe, the title was used by the Pannonian Avars and the early Bulgars during the early medieval period before being more widely spread by various Muslim chieftains in a region spanning the empires centred in modern-day Turkey and Crimea to those in the Indian subcontinent.

Khan as a surname is occasionally found among people of Turkic and Mongolic descent, but is a far more common name among Muslims in South Asia, including Afghanistan, Pakistan, Bangladesh and India.

, Khan is one of the most common surnames worldwide, shared by over 22 million people in Asia and 23 million people worldwide. It is the surname of over 108,674 British Asians, making it the 12th-most common surname in the United Kingdom.

People
 Bahlul Khan Lodi (1401 – 12 July 1489) was the chief of the Pashtun Lodi tribe. Founder of the Lodi dynasty from the Delhi Sultanate upon the abdication of the last claimant from the previous Sayyid rule. Bahlul became sultan of the dynasty on 19 April 1451 (855 AH).

 Khushal Khan Khattak (1613 – 25 February 1689; Pashto: خوشال خان خټک), also known as Khushal Baba, was a Pashtun poet, chief, and warrior.

 Mirwais Khan Hotak, revolted against Safavid Iran and established the Hotak dynasty.

 Azad Khan Afghan rose to power between 1752 and 1757, and controlled part of the Azerbaijan region up to Urmia city, northwestern and northern Persia, and parts of southwestern Turkmenistan and eastern Kurdistan.
 Mohammad Khatirjama Khan leader of Pathan tribe gained control over north Indian territory of today's Uttar Pradesh in 20th century, formed his capital in the area known as Barwaliya.

Scholars, intellectuals and academics
 Ahmed Raza Khan (1856–1921), Sunni Islamic scholar of south Asia
 Dilwar Khan, Bengali poet
 Gul Khan Nasir (1914–1983), poet, historian and politician from Pakistan
 Geoffrey Khan (born 1958), professor of Semitic Languages at the University of Cambridge
 Muhammad Mojlum Khan, non-fiction writer best known for The Muslim 100
 Muhammad Siddiq Khan (1910–1978), Bengali academic from Bangladesh, "father of the Library and Information Science discipline in Bangladesh"
M. A. Muqtedar Khan, American Islamic philosopher, Sufi and academic
 Rukhsana Khan, Pakistani-Canadian children's writer and storyteller
Salman "Sal" Khan, Muslim Bengali-American educator, known for the online Khan Academy
 Sirajul Hossain Khan, editor of Pakistan Times and the Eastern News Agency
 Wahiduddin Khan, Islamic scholar and peace activist
 Wasiullah Khan, Pakistani-American educator and founder of East–West University in Chicago
 Yasmin Khan (b. 1977), Associate Professor of History, Kellogg College, Oxford

Politicians and rulers
 Abdul Majid Khan, former MP for Habiganj-2, Bangladesh
 Abdul Majid Khan Tarin (1877–1939), senior political figure of the North-West Frontier Province, British India
 Abu'l-Khayr Khan founder of Shaybanid Dynasty of Uzbekistan
 Akram Khan (born 1970), Indian politician
 Imran Ahmad Khan, British politician, former Conservative MP
 Ali Haider Khan (1896–1963), Nawab of Longla, Minister of Power (Assam Province). 
 Alivardi Khan (1671–1756), Nawab of Bengal, Bihar and Orissa
 Ali Amjad Khan (1871-1905), Nawab of Longla, Magistrate. 
 Amanullah Khan, Sovereign of Afghanistan 1919-1929
 Amir Khan (Pindari) (1768–1834), Pindari leader in the early 19th century, later the Nawab of Tonk
 Arif Mohammad Khan, Indian politician and current governor of Kerala
 Asaf Khan, Wazir (Prime Minister) of Emperor Jahangir and Shahjahan
 Asif Nawaz Khan Janjua (1937–1993), former Chief Of Army Staff of the Pakistan Army
 Ataur Rahman Khan (1907–1991), Bengali activist politician, later Chief Minister of East Pakistan
 Ayub Khan (field marshal), Pakistan Army's only Field Marshall and president of Pakistan
 Ayub Khan (Emir of Afghanistan), former emir of Afghanistan during the Second Anglo-Afghan War
 Bahlul Khan (died 1488), founder of the Lodi dynasty
 Bairam Khan (1501–1561), Mughal commander, mentor and guardian of Akbar the Great
 Bilge Kul Qadir Khan, first ruler of Kara-Khanid empire
 Bismillah Khan Mohammadi, politician in Afghanistan
 Bostan Khan Tarin, 19th-century Pashtun clan warrior
 Chaudhry Ali Akbar Khan (1911–1967), Pakistani Federal Minister for Home Affairs 1964–1966
 Chaudhry Aurangzeb Khan, of the British era
 Dilal Khan (1585-1666), Muslim ruler of Sandwip
 Dost Mohammad Khan, Sovereign of the Kingdom of Cabool and Afghanistan during the 19th century
 Fatali Khan Khoyski, first Prime Minister of Azerbaijan Democratic Republic
 Fateh Naseeb Khan, Chief General of Alwar Armed Forces
 Feroz Khan Noon (1893–1970), former Prime Minister of Pakistan
 Franklin Khan, Trinidad and Tobago politician
 Fuad Khan (born 1955), Trinidad and Tobago politician
 Ganj Ali Khan, military officer and Governor in Safavid Iran
 Genghis Khan, Mongol warlord of the 12th century
 German Khan, Russian oligarch
 Ghazala Khan, mother of American soldier Humayun Khan
 Raja Ghazanfar Ali Khan Khokhar, one of Pakistan's first Federal Ministers
 Ghulam Jilani Khan (1925–1999), Governor of Punjab 1980 to 1985
 Habibullah Khan, Emir of Afghanistan from 1901 to 1919
 Hafiz Khan, Fijian Businessman, former Senator, and President of the Muslim League
 Haydar Khan, 2nd Wazir of Sylhet
 Hulagu Khan, ruler of Mongolian horde
 Humayun Khan (soldier), United States Army Captain, died in the Iraq War in 2004
 Iftikhar Khan (1909–1949), had been nominated to become the first local Commander in Chief of Pakistan
 Imran Khan, Former Prime Minister of Pakistan from 2018–2022
 Ismail Khan, former Afghan politician and warlord from Herat
 Khan Abdul Ghaffar Khan Badshah Khan (1890–1988), Pashtun leader and activist
 Khan Sahib Shahal Khan Khoso (1909–1956), Baloch leader, MLA West Pakistan Assembly from 1953 to 1956
 Khizr Khan, first ruler of Sayyid Dynasty, fourth period of the Delhi Sultanate
 Khizr Muazzam Khan, father of American soldier Humayun, known for a speech at the 2016 Democratic National Convention
 Khudadad Khan (1888–1971), Indian recipient of the Victoria Cross
 Kublai Khan, king of China and founder of Yuan Dynasty
 Kutb Khan, commandant of Mahim when it was under Gujarat Sultanate
 Krum Khan, ruler and founder of Bulgaria
 Liaquat Ali Khan (1895–1951), 1st Prime Minister of Pakistan
 Maryam Khan (born 1989), member of the Connecticut State House
 M.J. Khan, member of the Houston City Council
 Malik Umar Hayat Khan (1875–1944), elected member of the Council of State of India
 Munawar Khan, soldier of INA and later Pakistani Army, known for Operation Gibraltar
 Mahboob Ali Khan, 6th Nizam of Hyderabad, popularly known as Teesmaar Khan
 Mir Osman Ali Khan (1886–1967), 7th Nizam of Kingdom of Hyderabad
 Mir Lawang Khan, politician of Balochistan and brother of Gul Khan Nasir
 Mete Khan, ruler and warlord of China in 2nd century BCE
 Sultan Fetih Mehmet Khan, Ottoman sultan and conqueror of Constantinople
 Muhammad Hamidullah Khan (1938–2011), Bangladeshi military leader, politician and author
 General Muhammad Musa Khan Hazara, former Chief Of Army Staff of the Pakistan Army
 Muhammed Akbar Khan, the first Muslim to become a General in British Indian Army
 Mohammad Daoud Khan, former (1909-1978), former Prime Minister and President of Afghanistan
 Muhammad Khan Junejo (1932–1993), former Prime Minister of Pakistan
 Murshid Quli Khan ( 1665–1727), founder of the Nawab rulers in Bengal
 Nauroz Khan (1874-1964), Balochi Independence movement leader
 Nawab Ali Abbas Khan, Jatiya Party politician and three-time MP for Maulvibazar-2, Bangladesh
 Nawab Ali Haider Khan, 9th Nawab of Longla, minister and leader of the Independent Muslim Party
 Nawab Qaim Khan, 14th-century Ameer of the Delhi Sultanate and chief of Qaimkhani clan
 Nawazish Alam Khan (Hindi: नवाज़िश आलम ख़ान), Indian Baloch politician and member of the Sixteenth Legislative Assembly of Uttar Pradesh
 Nisar Ali Khan (born 1954), Pakistani politician, former cabinet minister and opposition leader in the National Assembly of Pakistan
 Prince Aly Khan (1911–1960), Pakistani United Nations diplomat
 Prince Sadruddhin Aga Khan (1933–2003), diplomat, UN High Commissioner for Refugees from 1965 to 1977
 Qasim Khan, was the founder of Qasim Khanate dynasty of russia
 Qasim Khan politician of pakistan and former deputy speaker of Pakistan from 2018 to 2022
 Rabina Khan, councillor for Shadwell and former Housing Cabinet member in Tower Hamlets, London
 Raeesah Khan, former Member of Parliament in Singapore
 Raja Habib ur Rahman Khan (1913–1978), Indian freedom fighter with the Indian National Army
 Raja Muhammad Zulqarnain Khan, President of AJK
 Raja Muhammed Sarfraz Khan (1905–1968), member of the Pakistan Movement
 Raja Sakhi Daler Khan Mangral, Kashmiri freedom fighter with the Indian National Army
 Raja Saroop Khan, former Governor of Punjab
 Rana Khudadad Khan, President of Pakistan Muslim League (Punjab)
 Rana Afzal Khan (1949–2019), Finance Minister of Pakistan and PML-N Leader
 Rana Mohammad Hanif Khan (1922–2005), Finance Minister of Pakistan
 Rana Muhammad Iqbal Khan, Speaker of the Punjab Assembly from 2008
 Rana Nazeer Ahmed Khan (born 1949), Pakistani former Federal Minister
 Rana Phool Muhammad Khan, MPA from Bhai Pheru (Phool Nagar)
 Purnendu Khan, MP from Uluberia Constituency of Bengal
 Sadiq Khan, Mayor of London
 Saifullah Khan family is a prominent political family of modern-day Pakistan, also known as Khans of Mewat
 Sahabzada Yaqub Khan (born 1920), Pakistani general and diplomat
 Sardar Farooq Khan Leghari (1940–2010), first Baloch president of Pakistan
 Sardar Muhammad Ibrahim Khan (1915–2003), founder of Azad Jammu Kashmir State
 Sardar Shaukat Hayat Khan (1915–1998), senior political figure and lieutenant of the Quaid-i-Azam in the Punjab
 Sardar Sikandar Hayat Khan (born 1934), former Prime Minister and President of Azad Jammu and Kashmir
 Sardar Sir Sikandar Hayat Khan (1892–1942), KCSI, Premier of the Punjab
 Sikandar Khan Ghazi, commander during the Conquest of Gour and the 1st Wazir of Sylhet
 Shah Mahmud Khan, former Prime Minister of the Kingdom of Afghanistan
 Shah Nawaz Khan (general) (1914–1983), Major General of the Indian National Army, one of the three of the famed Red Fort Trio
 Shah Nawaz Khan Janjua (1914–1983), Indian freedom fighter with the Indian National Army
 Shah Nawaz Khan, revolutionary in India of the Janjua Rajput
 Shaista Khan, Mughal governor of Bengal from 1664 to 1688
 Shaybani Khan the Uzbek ruler of Samarkand and king who revived Shaybanid Dynasty.
 Sir Muhammad Zafarullah Khan (1893–1985), the first Foreign Minister of Pakistan
 Sulaiman Khan Karrani, Sultan of Bengal
 Sultan Suleiman Khan (Suleiman the Magnificent) (1494–1566), Ottoman Turkish Sultan
 Mesbahuddin Ahmed Khan (1893–1947), British Indian Zamindar of Bhawal Fuldi Estate and 16th Head of The House Of Auliya
 Tughral Tughan Khan, 13th-century Mamluk Governor
 Turram Khan, revolutionary fighter from Hyderabad whose name has become eponym of bravery in many Indian languages
 Tikka Khan (1915–2002), former Chief of Army Staff of the Pakistan Army
 Wazir Akbar Khan (1816-1847), prince and general in Afghanistan
 Yulbars Khan Uyghur General of Kuomintang, also known as "Tiger General" for his bravery, provincial Governor of Xinjiang province from 1951 to 1971
 Yusaf Khan (Muhammad Yusaf Khan) (born 1948), former Vice Chief Of Army Staff of the Pakistan Army
 Zafar Khan, former general in the Afghan National Army ,Daku Muhammad Khan from chakwal belongs to dhurnal Awan tribe

Actors and entertainers

 Aamir Khan, Indian actor, film producer and director
 Abdul Karim Khan, Indian classical vocalist
 Abdul Wahid Khan, Indian musician, mentor of many singers like Muhammad Rafi and Ram Narayan
 Adil Khan, Norwegian actor of Pashtun and Punjabi descent
 Adnan Sami Khan, Indian singer, playback singer and music composer
 Aiman Khan, Pakistani film and television actress, sister of actress Minal Khan
 Akram Khan (dancer), British dancer of Bangladeshi descent
 Anik Khan, Bangladesh-born American rapper
 Ali Akbar Khan, Bangladesh Bengali sarod player
 Alvira Khan Agnihotri, Indian film producer and fashion designer (Salman Khan's sister and Salim Khan's daughter)
 Amar Khan, Pakistani director, writer and television actress
 Amjad Khan, Indian actor and director
 Arbaaz Khan, Indian actor, director and film producer (Salman Khan's brother)
 Asad Amanat Ali Khan (1955–2007), Pakistani vocalist
 Ayesha Sultana Khan (Sharmila Tagore), actress, model, Central Board of Film Certification chairperson (mother of Saif Ali Khan)
 Ayub Khan, Indian television and film actor (Nasir Khan's son and Dilip Kumar's nephew)
 Attaullah Khan pakistani singer
 Bat for Lashes, stage name of Natasha Khan, British singer-songwriter and musician
 Bilal Khan (disambiguation), several people
 Cassius Khan, Canadian Indian classical musician in New Westminster, known as the Ghazal/Tabla Wizard
 Chaka Khan, American R&B singer
 Conrad Khan, British actor
 Dilip Kumar (born Muhammad Yusuf Khan), Indian actor of Pashtun origin
 Faisal Khan, Indian actor (Aamir Khan's brother)
 Farah Khan, Indian film director, choreographer, dancer and fashion designer
 Faraaz Khan, Indian film actor of 1990s and early 2000s
 Fardeen Khan, Indian actor (son of Feroz Khan)
 Fawad Khan, Pakistani film actor and singer, also worked in Indian films
 Feroz Khan, Indian actor, director and film producer (father of Fardeen Khan)
 Feroze Khan, Pakistani television actor and producer
 Gauahar Khan, Indian model and actress
 Gul Khan, Indian television producer
 Guz Khan (born 1986), English comedian and actor
 Helen Richardson Khan, Indian actress (wife of Salim Khan)
 Hina Khan, Indian television actress
 Imran Khan (Bollywood actor) (born Imran Pal), Indian American actor, works in Bollywood (Aamir Khan's nephew)
 Imran Khan (singer), Dutch singer of Punjabi descent
 Irrfan Khan (1967–2020), Indian actor (in Indian films and Hollywood films)
 Jiah Khan, British-American actress who worked in Indian Bollywood films
 Junaid Khan, Pakistani film actor, singer and writer
 Kabir Khan, Indian director, screenwriter, cinematographer and film producer
 Kareena Kapoor Khan, Indian actress (wife of Saif Ali Khan, member of Kapoor family, daughter of actor Randhir Kapoor and actress Babita)
 Khalil Ullah Khan, film and TV actor, 1976 winner of Bangladesh National Film Award for Best Supporting Actor
 King Khan, real name Arish Khan, Indian/French-Canadian musician
 Krutika Desai Khan, Indian actress working in film, television and theatre
 Mahira Khan, Pakistani drama and film actress, also works in Bollywood
 Mansoor Khan, Indian director, film producer and screenwriter (Nasir Hussain's son, Aamir Khan's cousin)
 Marco Khan, Iranian actor
 Mehboob Khan, Indian director, film producer, actor and writer
 Minal Khan, Pakistani television actress, sister of actress Aiman Khan
 Nahnatchka Khan, American television writer and producer
 Nasir Hussain Khan, Indian director, film producer and screenwriter (Aamir Khan's uncle)
 Nasir Khan, Indian actor (Dilip Kumar's brother)
 Nazir Ahmed Khan, Indian director, film producer and actor in British India and then Pakistan (brother-in-law of filmmaker K. Asif)
 Nikhat Khan, Indian film producer (Aamir Khan's sister)
 Noor Khan, Pakistani television actress and sister of actress Sarah Khan
 Nusrat Fateh Ali Khan, Pakistani vocalist
 Parvati Khan, Indo-Trinidadian singer and model who worked in Bollywood
 Praga Khan, real name Maurice Engelen, Belgian techno musician
 Rahat Nusrat Fateh Ali Khan, vocalist
 Rehan Khan, Bollywood singer from Goa
 Riyaz Khan, South Indian actor
 Roy Sætre Khantatat, Norwegian singer, better known as Roy Khan
 Shafqat Amanat Ali Khan, Pakistani vocalist
 Saif Ali Khan, Indian actor (son of Sharmila Tagore, husband of Kareena Kapoor)
 Sajid Khan, Indian actor and singer
 Sajid Khan, Indian film director and actor
 Salim Khan, Indian screenwriter and scriptwriter (father of Salman Khan), part of screenwriting duo Salim–Javed
 Salman Khan, Indian actor and film producer
 Sana Khan, Indian model and television actress
 Sanjay Khan, Indian actor, director and film producer (father of Zayed Khan)
 Sarah Khan, Pakistani TV actress in Urdu television serials
 Saroj Khan, Indian choreographer
 Shahid Khan, British DJ, record producer, songwriter and musician known professionally as Naughty Boy
 Shahrukh Khan, Indian actor, film producer (known as King Khan)
 Sahil Khan, Indian actor
 Shakib Khan, Bangladeshi actor, producer, singer, film organiser and media personality
 Soha Ali Khan, Indian actress (Saif Ali Khan's sister, daughter of actress Sharmila Tagore)
 Sohail Khan, Indian actor, director and film producer (brother of Salman Khan)
 Sudhir, real name Shah Zaman Khan Afridi, actor
 Tahir Hussain Khan, Indian director and film producer (Aamir Khan's father)
 Tariq Khan, Indian actor (Aamir Khan's cousin, Nasir Hussain's nephew)
 Valentino Khan, American DJ, music producer, guitarist, singer, songwriter
 Zareen Khan, Bollywood actress who has also appeared in Tamil and Punjabi films
 Zayed Khan, Indian actor (Sanjay Khan's son, Sussanne Khan's brother, brother-in-law of Hrithik Roshan)

Sportspeople
Khan, former ring name of retired American professional wrestler Dave Bautista
 Imran Khan, Former Prime Minister of Pakistan, politician and former cricketer and captain of the Pakistan cricket team
 Akram Khan (cricketer), former captain of the Bangladeshi Cricket Team
 Amir Khan (British boxer), British boxer of Pakistani descent
Mohsin Khan, former Pakistani cricketer
 Moin Khan, former Pakistani cricketer
 Muhammad Essa Khan, former Pakistani footballer
 Athar Ali Khan, Bangladeshi former cricketer, selector and cricket commentator
 Carla Khan, Pakistani professional squash player
 Hajra Khan, Pakistani footballer
 Kaleemullah Khan, Pakistani footballer
 Jahangir Khan, former Pakistani professional squash player and World No. 1
 Jansher Khan, former Pakistani professional squash player and World No. 1
 Mir Sultan Khan, Pakistani chess champion
 Nafees Iqbal (Mohammad Nafees Iqbal Khan), Bangladeshi cricketer
 Nasim Khan, Pakistani cricketer
 Shahid Khan Afridi, Pakistani cricketer
 Salman Khan, Indian cricketer
 Shahrukh Khan, Indian cricketer
 Junaid Khan, Pakistani cricketer
 Usman Khan Shinwari, Pakistani cricketer
 Simon Khan, English golfer
 Tamim Iqbal (Tamim Iqbal Khan), Bangladeshi cricketer
 Younus Khan, Pakistani cricketer
 Sajid Khan, Pakistani cricketer
 Shadab Khan, Pakistani cricketer
 Sharjeel Khan, Pakistani cricketer
 Vitaly Khan, Kazakhstani freestyle swimmer
 Zaheer Khan, Indian cricketer
 Rocky Khan, All Blacks 7s rugby player
 Rashid Khan, Afghanistan international cricketer
 Zahir Khan, Afghanistan international cricketer

In science and technology
 Abdul Qadeer Khan, Pakistani engineer, considered the founder of Pakistan's nuclear weapons programme
 Akhtar Hameed Khan pakistani Social Scientist and development practitioner
 Fazlur Khan, Bengali-American structural engineer and designer of Chicago's Sears Tower and John Hancock Center
 Ishfaq Ahmad Khan, Pakistani scientist in particle and nuclear physics
 Munir Ahmad Khan, Pakistani scientist in nuclear physics, credited as the father of Pakistan's Atomic Project
 Mohammad Islam Khan (1957–2010), Indian glycobiologist, scientist at the National Chemical Laboratory
 Naeem Ahmad Khan (1928–2013), Pakistani nuclear physicist and university professor of physics
 Shaukat Hameed Khan, Pakistani nuclear physicist
 Mohammad Ajmal Khan, physician in Delhi, India, one of the founders of the Jamia Millia Islamia University
 Muhammad Siddiq Khan (1910–1978), librarian of the Central Library of the University of Dhaka and the founder of the university's Department of Library Science
 Iqrar Ahmad Khan, Pakistani agricultural scientist, professor of horticulture at the University of Agriculture, Faisalabad in Pakistan
 Razib Khan, Bengali-American geneticist

Other professions
 Abul Kashem Khan (1905–1991), jurist, political leader, and industrialist from Bangladesh
 Alan Khan (born 1971), South African radio presenter
 Amjad Khan (1940–1992), Indian film producer
 Baseera Khan, American artist
 Fazal Khan, Pakistani lawyer and Pashtun human rights activist
 Gauri Khan (born 1971), Indian interior designer and film producer (wife of Indian star Shahrukh Khan)
 Hakim Khan descendent of Shershah Suri and chief commander of Rana Pratap's army
 Inayat Khan, (1882–1927), founder of Universal Sufism and the Sufi Order International
 Irene Khan (born 1956), Bangladeshi lawyer, former Secretary General of Amnesty International
 Kiran Rao Khan (born 1973), Indian director, film producer and screenwriter (wife of Indian star Aamir Khan)
 The (unknown) 'M Khan', the subject of many gag routines on The Mary Whitehouse Experience because of long-standing graffiti visible from a major London road
 Mirza Abu Taleb Khan (1752–1805/6), Indian tax-collector and travel-writer
 Mohammad Sidique Khan (1974–2005), London train suicide bomber
 Nawab Muhammad Hayat Khan (1833–1901) British-Indian administrator and aristocrat
 Noor Inayat Khan (1914–1944), British spy in occupied France
 Oghuz Khan, legendary forefather of the Turkic people
 Peter Khan (born Afghan-Khan), Australian member of the Universal House of Justice of the Bahá'í Faith
 Shahid Khan (born 1950), Pakistan-born American businessman, owner of the Jacksonville Jaguars and Fulham F.C.
 Sussanne Khan (born 1975), Indian interior fashion designer and entrepreneur
 Syed Ahmed Khan (1817–1898), Islamic scholar
 Tariq Ali Khan (born 1943), British-Pakistani writer, intellectual and socialist
 Tasmin Lucia Khan (born 1980), British Bangladeshi journalist and news presenter for BBC News
 Tony Khan (born 1982), American businessman; co-owner of the Jacksonville Jaguars and Fulham F.C. along with his father Shahid, and CEO, President of All Elite Wrestling and Ring of Honour Wrestling. 
 Vilayat Inayat Khan (1916–2004), former head of the Sufi Order International
 Usman Khan (1991-2019), Islamic terrorist and perpetrator of the 2019 London Bridge stabbing
 Zia Inayat Khan, the Pir of the Sufi Order International
 Shahid Khan, co-owner of the Jacksonville Jaguars of the National Football League (NFL) and Fulham F.C. of the EFL Championship, Founder, co-owner of the All Elite Wrestling (AEW) promotion.
 Shahal Khan, American Businessman and founder of Burkhan Family Office.nawab Malik Ameer Muhammad Khan he belongs to kalghan Awan tribe

Fictional characters
 Haman Khan, a prominent Gundam villain in Mobile Suit Zeta Gundam and the principal antagonist in its sequel Mobile Suit Gundam ZZ; and her father Maharaja Khan
 Kamal Khan, the main villain in the James Bond film Octopussy
 Kamala Khan, the fourth character to assume the identity of the Marvel Comics superheroine Ms. Marvel
 Khan, Primus of House Aico game character from Paladins
 Khan, character from the web-series Corner Shop Show
 Khan, one of the villains in the Broken Sword: The Shadow of the Templars computer game
 Khan, a Chinese-American detective from the Khan! 1975 US television series
 Manga Khan, a DC Comics character
 Rizwan Khan, main character in the 2010 Bollywood film My Name Is Khan
 Dark Khan, the main antagonist of the crossover video game Mortal Kombat vs. DC Universe who is the merging between Shao Khan and DC Comics villain Darkseid
Shadow Khan, the group of villains in animated series Jackie Chan Adventures
 Shere Khan, the tiger, in Rudyard Kipling's The Jungle Book, also adapted as a cartoon character in a Walt Disney Productions movie in 1967
 Shiwan Khan, a recurring enemy of The Shadow
 The Mandarin archenemy of Iron Man whose real name is Khan also from Marvel Comics
 Yasmin Khan, a companion of the Thirteenth Doctor in the BBC series Doctor Who
Khan Noonien Singh, an antagonist in the Star Trek franchise and the titular character of the 1982 film The Wrath of Khan
Mr Khan, British Pakistani character on British TV show Citizen Khan

See also
Khan (title)
Kahn, Germanic Jewish surname
Farrakhan
Chan, Chinese surname
List of places named Khan

References

Indian surnames
Pakistani names
Bangladeshi Muslim names
Bengali Muslim surnames
Mongolian-language surnames